Maksim Shiryayev may refer to:

 Maksim Shiryayev (footballer, born 1975), Russian football player
 Maksim Shiryayev (footballer, born 1995), Russian football player